Kevin David Walters (born 20 October 1967) is an Australian professional rugby league football coach who is the Head Coach of the Brisbane Broncos in the NRL and a former professional rugby league footballer who played as a premiership-winning  and  in the 1980s, 1990s and 2000s.

He previously coached the Queensland State of Origin team, as well as a former commentator for Fox League. Walters played for the Australian Kangaroos, Queensland Maroons and at professional club level primarily for the Brisbane Broncos.

Along with twin Kerrod and older brother Steve, Kevin Walters started his playing career in the Brisbane Rugby League premiership before joining the NSWRL. He spent some time playing for the Canberra Raiders before moving to the Brisbane Broncos, where he played for the majority of his career and eventually took over the club's captaincy. 

He played in premiership-winning teams on six occasions as either player or captain and holds the record for most finals appearances.

Following retirement, Walters started coaching with the Toowoomba Clydesdales as head coach (2001-2003), Brisbane Broncos as assistant coach (2003-2005, 2015, 2018), Queensland Maroons as assistant coach (2006-2008, 2014-2015), Ipswich Jets as head coach (2007-2008), Catalans Dragons as head coach (2009-2010), Melbourne Storm as assistant coach (2011-2013), Newcastle Knights as assistant coach (2014) and as Queensland Maroons head coach (2016-2020)

His coaching career continued as head coach of the Queensland Maroons until 2020 when he became head coach of the Brisbane Broncos.

Biography
Walters was born in Rockhampton, Queensland on 20 October 1967. He grew up playing football against future Brisbane Broncos (and Queensland) teammate Allan Langer and brothers Steve and Kerrod Walters. This combination of players was known famously as "The Ipswich Connection".

Playing career
Walters and his brothers played for the Booval Swifts club before Kevin played in the Brisbane Rugby League Premiership with the Norths club, then followed his brother Steve to the Canberra Raiders of the New South Wales Rugby League Premiership in 1987.

Canberra Raiders
In Canberra Walters was a reserve as a 19-year-old in the club's first grand final in 1987 which was lost to Manly-Warringah. That year he was named the Raiders' Rookie of the Year. Walters made his début for the Queensland Maroons in the 1989 State of Origin series, as a reserve in Game III. Later that year he got his first taste of premiership success, playing from the bench in the 1989 Grand Final win for Canberra.

Brisbane Broncos
Walters returned to Queensland in 1990, signing with the Brisbane Broncos to play alongside his twin brother Kerrod once again. Up until 1990, Wally Lewis was the Broncos' first choice for the  position, but coach Wayne Bennett moved Lewis to lock and Walters to five-eighth. This was because of Walters' darting runs and deft passing. That year he won the Broncos' Player of the Year award. Walters played from the reserve bench in all three games of the 1990 State of Origin series. He also made selection for the 1990 Kangaroo tour of Great Britain and France with twin brother Kerrod, playing in several tour matches against local sides but no test matches. The following year Walters was again selected to play in all three State of Origin matches for Queensland from the bench. He made his test match début on the 1991 Kangaroo tour of Papua New Guinea, where he and his brother Kerrod became the first twin brothers to play rugby league for Australia.

During the 1992 Great Britain Lions tour of Australia and New Zealand, Walters helped Australia retain The Ashes. Later that year he helped the Broncos to victory in the 1992 Grand Final which Brisbane won 28–8 against the St George Dragons. The Walters brothers had already become the first trio to play for Queensland and Australia in 1992 and they achieved another milestone when all three were selected to tour with the World Cup squad. In England Kevin Walters threw the winning pass for Steve Renouf's try that won the game 10–6 in Australia's 1992 World Cup Final victory. Indeed, 1992 was a great year for Walters, with further victory in the World Club Challenge against Wigan. The following year Walters again proved a great utility for the Broncos' 1993 grand final victory.

During the 1994 NSWRL season, Walters played at five-eighth for defending premiers Brisbane when they hosted British champions Wigan for the 1994 World Club Challenge. At the end of the season, he went on the 1994 Kangaroo tour.

In 1996 Walters' wife, Kim, was diagnosed with breast cancer.

Walters also played in the 1997 Super League Grand Final victory for Brisbane. Although not a consistent player for the Maroons, Walters was part of the winning 1998 State of Origin team, dummying his way over for a try in the decider. That year he played at five-eighth in the 1998 NRL grand final and won yet another premiership with the Broncos.

Following his wife's death in 1998, Kevin established the Kim Walters Choices program, a free community service that offers support to people diagnosed with cancer at the Wesley Hospital in Brisbane.

In 1999, with the retirement of Allan Langer, Walters was handed the Broncos' captaincy. He also captained Queensland in the second match of the 1999 State of Origin series. Walters' book, Brave Hearts was published in 1999.

Walters was awarded the Australian Sports Medal for his contribution to Australia's international standing in the sport of rugby league in 2000. He captained the Broncos at halfback in their 2000 NRL grand final win against the Sydney Roosters, claiming one more premiership ring with the club before moving to England at the request of Allan Langer. He played for Warrington briefly and decided it was not for him and his family, so moved back to Australia, playing his final season with the Broncos in 2001.

In 2003 Walters was one of the first four former players inducted into the Broncos official Hall of Fame.
During the 2007 season at the Broncos' 20-year anniversary celebration, the club announced a list of the 20 best players to play for them to date which included Walters.

Coaching career
Walters went on to coach the Toowoomba Clydesdales in the Queensland Cup competition and was also assistant coach under Wayne Bennett for the Brisbane Broncos. At the end of the 2005 season, after five successive years without a grand final appearance, Bennett decided to have a cleanout of the coaching staff, removing such long-time allies as Walters, Gary Belcher and Glenn Lazarus. Walters then became head coach of the Ipswich Jets playing in the Queensland Cup before attracting the attention of the Super League.

Catalans Dragons
Walters was appointed as the new coach of Catalans Dragons from the 2009 season. He had been linked with the role of head coach at the French Super League team for some time. His first season at Catalans did not start well, with only one win from the club's first 6 matches. However, by the end of his second season with the club, he'd taken them to within one match of the 2009 Super League Grand Final, losing to eventual Champions, Leeds Rhinos.

After the 2010 season, Walters returned to Australia as assistant coach to Craig Bellamy at NRL club Melbourne Storm.

In 2014, Walters was reunited with the former Broncos coach Wayne Bennett as a halves coach at the Newcastle Knights.

After Bennett's announcement to return to the Brisbane Broncos as head coach for 2015, Walters followed. He was appointed as assistant coach, sharing the role with former New Zealand Warriors Head Coach, Stephen Kearney.

Queensland 
On 28 December 2015, Walters was appointed as head coach of the Queensland State of Origin team, succeeding Mal Meninga whose elevation to the role as Australian Test coach meant he had to resign as Maroons coach.

In his first year in charge of Queensland, Walters guided them to a 2–1 series victory over New South Wales.  The following year in 2017, Walters repeated the same feat with Queensland.  In the 2018 State of Origin series, New South Wales won the series by 2–1.  Queensland managed to avoid a clean sweep by winning the final game at Suncorp Stadium.

Before the start of the 2019 State of Origin series, it was revealed that Walters used the bizarre tactic of fining Queensland players who mentioned New South Wales by name or referred to them as 'Blues'.  Walters reportedly told Queensland players they were to only refer to the New South Wales team by the names ‘other state’ or ‘southern state’.

Queensland would go on to win the first game of the series but suffered a humiliating 38–6 loss in the second game which was played at Optus Stadium.  In the post match press conference, Walters said of the game "We were poor in a lot of areas tonight, I am not going to single out one player, even our kick off to start the game was shit. Across the board we just weren't in the game. It was everywhere. The kick-off fucking pissed me off. It didn't go far enough. They beat us up everywhere".

In game 3 of the series, Queensland lost the match in the final 20 seconds of the game after New South Wales scored a length of the field try through James Tedesco.

Brisbane Broncos
Walters was officially appointed head coach of the Brisbane Broncos on 30 September 2020, resigning as head coach of the Maroons to take the position.

In round 3 of the 2021 NRL season, he earned his first victory as Brisbane head coach when they defeated Canterbury-Bankstown 24-0.  It was Brisbane's first win in 259 days.

In round 8 of the 2021 NRL season, Brisbane came from 22-0 down against the Gold Coast to win the match 36-28 earning Walters his second win as Brisbane head coach.

References

Further reading

External links

'Rugby league great Kevin Walters' – ABC Queensland story

1967 births
Living people
Australia national rugby league team players
Australian rugby league coaches
Australian rugby league players
Brisbane Broncos captains
Brisbane Broncos players
Canberra Raiders players
Catalans Dragons coaches
Ipswich Jets coaches
Norths Devils players
Queensland Rugby League State of Origin captains
Queensland Rugby League State of Origin coaches
Queensland Rugby League State of Origin players
Recipients of the Australian Sports Medal
Rugby league five-eighths
Rugby league halfbacks
Rugby league players from Rockhampton, Queensland
Toowoomba Clydesdales coaches
Australian twins
Twin sportspeople
Kevin
Warrington Wolves players